Eremiaphila persica is a species of praying mantis found in Turkey, Iran, and Azerbaijan.

See also
List of mantis genera and species

References

Eremiaphila
Insects of Asia
Insects described in 1905